This is a list of Gaelic footballers who have played on a losing team in the final of the All-Ireland Senior Football Championship. Losing teams receive runners-up medals.

This list only includes (1) footballers whose medal(s) resulted from being on the field of play in a final; and (2) footballers who did not or have not won a winners' medal in a prior or later final. Players are organised by year of first medal, then number of medals, then surname.

References

Lists of Gaelic football players
Winners of All-Ireland medals by count (Gaelic football)